Otherworld is a creator-owned mini series by writer/artist Phil Jimenez released in 2005 and published by DC Comics's Vertigo imprint. The book as described by Jimenez is "The Real World meets The Lord of the Rings meets Tron".

Synopsis
Otherworld is an epic, multipart "space opera" about a group of Los Angeles college students who find themselves on the front lines of an inter-dimensional border war. Otherworld revolves around 19-year-old Siobhan Monyihan, a student at the fictional University of Los Angeles and the progressive lead singer of a burgeoning LA band, and her boyfriend and rival, Jason Ng. Siobhan is an incredibly powerful sorceress, descended from a mystic lineage millennia old, and alone holds the key to stopping the impending war in Otherworld, the Celtic land of magic and the dead. Drafted into the same conflict, Jason, a brilliant young man whose worldview is more clearly delineated in black and white, assumes control of the military forces of Siobhan's enemies, the Technocracy.

Siobhan and Jason are brought to the war in Otherworld by Cessaire, an ancient sorceress, who kidnaps Siobhan and several of her closest friends, along with a few innocent bystanders, away from Los Angeles and across the dimensions to her magical realm. The sorceress Sushil, a traitor to her people, interferes with Cessaire's plans. Half of her charges, including Siobhan, end up in the Realm, a nation of Otherworld run by powerful wizards and inhabited by legendary creatures. The other half, including her recently betrayed boyfriend Jason, are sent to the City, an advanced technological land inhabited by bizarre cyborgs, who are not necessarily the villains Cessaire describes them to be.

Separated by a seemingly impenetrable wall of energy, both nations of Otherworld believed themselves threatened with extinction by the other. After learning that her mentor Cessaire is not as benevolent as she first appeared, Siobhan evolves quickly from a privileged, idealistic young college student into a sorceress supreme and military leader, uniting several disparate groups of mystic beings into one powerful army. Conversely, Jason, driven by his desire to transform Otherworld into a nation that will answer only to him and his all consuming obsession with Siobhan (fueled by his recent discovery that she's been cheating on him with his best friend Donnie), takes over the City from its obsolete leader and becomes its Prime Director.

Siobhan and Jason then lead their peoples against each other in war pits friend against friend in an epic battle between the armies of sorcery and technology.

Collected Editions

References 

Vertigo Comics limited series